Panagra may refer to:

 Panagra (moth), a genus of moth in the family Geometridae
 Panagra, Cyprus, a village in Cyprus
 Pan American-Grace Airways, a former airline